Andersson's Kalle (Swedish: Anderssonskans Kalle) is a 1934 Swedish comedy film directed by Sigurd Wallén and starring  Thor Modéen, Tollie Zellman and Naemi Briese. It was shot at the Råsunda Studios and on location around Stockholm. The film's sets were designed by the art director Arne Åkermark. It is based on the 1901 novel of the same title by Emil Norlander, which has been adapted into films on several occasions.

Synopsis
Kalle, a young boy who is fond of practical jokes, lives in the Södermalm district of Stockholm with his elder sister Majken and his widowed mother. His pranks lead him into trouble with the local police officer.

Cast
 Thor Modéen as Police Constable Jonsson
 Tollie Zellman as 	Bobergskan
 Hjördis Petterson as 	Mrs. Pilgren
 Signe Lundberg-Settergren as Anderssonskan
 Naemi Briese as Majken
 Nils Hallberg as 	Kalle Andersson
 Björn Berglund as Gustaf Bergström
 Weyler Hildebrand as 	Schröder
 Jullan Kindahl as Mrs. Lundström
 Julia Cæsar as 	Lövdalskan
 Sonja Claesson as Lundkvistskan
 Wilma Malmlöf as 	Lindkvistskan
 Thyra Leijman-Uppström as 	Ferry Passenger
 Millan Fjellström as 	Petterssonskan
 Nils Wahlbom as 	Second
 Emil Fjellström as	Farm Hand
 Anna Olin as 	Landlady
 Gerda Björne as 	Teacher
 Olof Sandborg as 	Doctor
 Stina Seelig as 	Teacher
 Artur Cederborgh as Bricklayer
 Einar Fagstad as 	Steersman
 Gustaf Lövås as 	Gardner
 Rudolf Svensson as 	Bricklayer
 John Ericsson as 	Bricklayer 
 Sven-Eric Gamble as Boy
 Mona Geijer-Falkner as 	Cleaning lady 
 Ruth Weijden as 	Lady 
 Helga Brofeldt as 	Woman on the boat 
 Erland Colliander as 	Managing Director

References

Bibliography 
 Qvist, Per Olov & von Bagh, Peter. Guide to the Cinema of Sweden and Finland. Greenwood Publishing Group, 2000.

External links 
 

1934 films
Swedish comedy films
1934 comedy films
1930s Swedish-language films
Films directed by Sigurd Wallén
Films based on Swedish novels
Remakes of Swedish films
Films set in Stockholm
1930s Swedish films